Henry Goring (6 April 1646 – 10 June 1685) was an English soldier and politician who sat in the House of Commons between 1673 and 1685.

Goring was the son of Sir Henry Goring, 2nd Baronet of the first creation and his wife Diana Bishopp daughter of Sir Edward Bishopp. He was a captain in the Regiment of Foot. In 1671 he purchased an estate at Wappingthorn, Steyning, Sussex.

Goring was elected Member of Parliament (MP) for New Shoreham in 1673 and held the seat to 1678. In 1679 he was elected MP for Bramber and held the seat until 1685. In 1685 he was elected MP for Steyning. He was High Sheriff of Sussex from 1681 to 1682.

Goring was killed at a theatre by Sir Edward Dering, 3rd Baronet, or Dering's son Charles, at the age of 39.

Goring had married, firstly, Elizabeth Morewood, daughter of Anthony Morewood, in October 1667 and secondly, Mary Covert, daughter of Sir John Covert, 1st Baronet, in 1676. He left three sons, one, Sir Charles Goring, 3rd Baronet by his first wife and two, including Sir Henry Goring, 4th Baronet, by his second.

References

1646 births
1685 deaths
High Sheriffs of Sussex
English MPs 1661–1679
English MPs 1679
English MPs 1680–1681
English MPs 1681
English MPs 1685–1687
Assassinated English politicians
People from Steyning